The Swiss 7.5mm center-fire revolver cartridge, also known as 7.5x23mmR, was used militarily in the 1882 and 1882/1929 revolvers of the Swiss army, as well as in Swiss civilian revolvers of the 'bulldog' type. The case is of brass; the heeled bullet is of a hard lead alloy, fully jacketed and coated externally with a wax lubricant.

Very similar revolver cartridges were used in the late 19th century military revolvers adopted by the armies of Belgium, Luxembourg, Sweden, Norway, and Serbia.

.32 S&W Long with lead (non-jacketed) bullets is very similar ballistically and in dimensions, so Swiss revolvers are often shot with it, especially by handloaders.

References
Portions of this entry were derived from the following specialized French-language magazines:
Cibles (Fr)
AMI (B, discontinued in 1988)
Gazette des armes (Fr)
Action Guns (Fr)

External links
 https://www.swisswaffen.com/75mm-revolverpatrone-1882/rp82/wxao1k5rteke
 http://i2.photobucket.com/albums/y23/Swissman25/1929/sIMG_3034.jpg
 https://www.swisswaffen.com/model-1929-ordnance-revolver/r29/wueeizndh1lr

Military cartridges
Weapons of Switzerland